The Yamaha XT250 is a  motorcycle made by Yamaha Motor Company.

First generation

Released in 1980, this dual-sport motorcycle has been a staple of back roads and farms. One was ridden by Rambo in the 1982 movie First Blood.

It also featured in Season 4 of Knight Rider, as Reginald Cornelius III/RC3's bike.

Second generation

Starting in 1984, this model had its top-end output reduced to 17 hp @ 7,500 rpm due to emissions control considerations. In addition, this model featured redesigned plastics and a more compact gasoline tank.

Third generation

Having been discontinued in 1991 in favor of the Yamaha XT350, this model was reintroduced in 2008, replacing the Yamaha XT225, due to increased popularity of the 250 cc class. The XT250 is branded the SEROW 250 in Japan.  In 2013, the USA XT250 received a fuel-injected engine.

In January 2020, Yamaha Japan released the Serow Final Model, discontinuing the little bike due to increasing emission requirements. This is its final year. Yamaha US has continued the model unchanged.

(For the origin of the name, see serow.)

References

XT250
Dual-sport motorcycles
Motorcycles introduced in 1980

ja:ヤマハ・セロー